{{DISPLAYTITLE:Zeta2 Scorpii}}

Zeta2 Scorpii (Zeta2 Sco, ζ2 Scorpii, ζ2 Sco) is a K-type orange giant star in the constellation of Scorpius. It has an apparent visual magnitude which varies between 3.59 and 3.65, and is located near the blue-white supergiant star ζ1 Scorpii in Earth's sky.  In astronomical terms, ζ2 is much closer to the Sun and unrelated to ζ1 except for line-of sight co-incidence. ζ1 is 5,700 light-years away and probably an outlying member of open star cluster NGC 6231 (also known as the "northern jewel box" cluster), whereas ζ2 is a mere 132 lightyears distant and thus much less luminous in real terms. ζ2 can also be distinguished from its optical partner, ζ1, because of its orangish colour especially in long-exposure astrophotographs.

References

Scorpius (constellation)
K-type giants
Scorpii, Zeta2
152334
082729
Suspected variables
6271
Durchmusterung objects